St Patrick's RC High School is a coeducational Roman Catholic secondary school in the Peel Green area of Eccles, Greater Manchester, England.

Established in 1957, St. Patrick's was re-organised as a comprehensive school in 1977. It is a voluntary aided school administered by Salford City Council and the Roman Catholic Diocese of Salford. The school moved into a new building in 2013 as part of the Building Schools for the Future programme.

St Patrick's RC High School offers GCSEs and BTECs as programmes of study for pupils. The school is named after Saint Patrick, a 5th-century Christian missionary and the first Bishop of Armagh in Ireland.

Notable former pupils
Josie Rourke, director
Michelle Keegan, actress
Samia Ghadie, actress
Rob James-Collier, actor
Isabel Hodgins, actress

References

External links
St Patrick's RC High School official website

Secondary schools in Salford
Catholic secondary schools in the Diocese of Salford
Educational institutions established in 1957
1957 establishments in England
Voluntary aided schools in England
Eccles, Greater Manchester